Samuel Augustine Miller (October 16, 1819 – November 19, 1890) was a politician, member of the Confederate Congress and military officer in the Confederate States Army during the American Civil War.

Biography
He was born to Reuben C. and Atlantic Ocean Walton Miller in Shenandoah County, Virginia. He married Helen M. Quarrier on July 27, 1845.

Miller briefly served in the Confederate army as a major, serving as the assistant quartermaster of the 22nd Virginia Infantry (1st Kanawha). He was a delegate to the First and Second Confederate Congresses from Virginia's 14th Congressional District from February 1863 until the end of the war in 1865, succeeding Albert G. Jenkins, who had rejoined the army as a brigadier general.

After the war, Miller was a member of the West Virginia House of Delegates from Kanawha County in 1875. He died in Parkersburg, West Virginia, and was buried at Spring Hill Cemetery in Charleston.

References and links
The Political Graveyard

1819 births
1890 deaths
Burials at Spring Hill Cemetery (Charleston, West Virginia)
Confederate States Army officers
Members of the Confederate House of Representatives from Virginia
19th-century American politicians
Members of the West Virginia House of Delegates
Politicians from Charleston, West Virginia
People from Shenandoah County, Virginia